Command Decisions was a series produced by Hoff Productions which aired on The History Channel in 2004. Each episode depicted an historic battle through re-creations, and gave the viewer an opportunity to test his or her skills, strategies, and nerve as a commander through nine questions. The viewer was asked to imagine themselves in the mind of the battlefield commander, and would choose from 3 options for how to proceed.

List of depicted battles:
Battle of the Bulge (December 1944-January 1945) Original Airdate: July 23, 2004
Battle of Britain (1940)
Battle of Iwo Jima (February–March 1945) Original Airdate: Dec. 18, 2004
Battle of Rivoli  (January 1797) Original Airdate: Dec. 5, 2004
San Juan Hill  (July 1898) Original Airdate: Nov. 24, 2004
Siege of Alesia (September 52 BC)
Tet Offensive (1968) Original Airdate: Sept. 24, 2004
Six Day War (June 1967) Original Airdate: Oct. 1, 2004
Cambrai (November–December 1917) Original Airdate: July 30, 2004
Châlons (June 451 AD) Original Airdate: Oct. 8, 2004
Gettysburg (July 1863) Original Airdate: Oct. 15, 2004
Little Bighorn (June 1876) Original Airdate: Oct. 22, 2004
Inch'on (September 1950)
Marathon (490 BC) Original Airdate: Sept. 10, 2004
Waterloo (June 1815) Original Airdate: Aug. 13, 2004
Stalingrad (August 1942-February 1943) Original Airdate: Aug. 13, 2004
Gulf War (Desert Shield Phase)(August 1990-February 1991) Original Airdate: Dec. 12, 2004
Desert Storm (January–February 1991) Original Airdate: Oct. 29, 2004
Midway (June 1942)
Saratoga (September–October 1777) Original Airdate: Oct. 20, 2004
Hastings (October 1066) Original Airdate: Nov. 18, 2004

The episode titled "The Siege of Alesia" was filmed in 2003 and featured the historical reenactment groups Legio X Fretensis as the Romans and a Celtic group named "Gaestate" who modified their equipment and costume to emulate Gauls of the First Century BC.

Broadcast Airings
Repeats of the series are currently airing on the digital broadcast network Quest.

Military television series
History (American TV channel) original programming